Neochetina bruchi, the chevroned water hyacinth weevil, is a species of marsh weevil in the beetle family Brachyceridae found in South America. It has been introduced into North America as biocontrol of the invasive plant Eichhornia crassipes (water hyacinth).

References

Further reading

External links

 

Brachyceridae
Articles created by Qbugbot
Beetles described in 1926